Hannah Heaton is a New England woman known for chronicling in a diary her experiences during the Great Awakening in the northern American royal colonies.

Autobiography
It is unclear when Heaton began her diary/autobiography, as the first few dozen pages are undated. These undated pages include a visit to Connecticut where she experienced religious conversion. The diary has entries over a period of 40 years, from the Great Awakening through to the American Revolution. Her autobiography has been of interest to historians as it chronicles the life of a mother and farmer during the Great Awakening.

References

1721 births
1794 deaths
American diarists
American women memoirists
18th-century American non-fiction writers
18th-century American women writers
18th-century diarists